The Euro-Cup was a Group 3 flat horse race in Germany open to thoroughbreds aged three years or older. It was run at Frankfurt over a distance of 2,000 metres (about 1¼ miles), and it was scheduled to take place each year in September.

History
The event was contested over 2,000 metres in 1986 and 1987. It was extended to 2,200 metres and given Group 3 status in 1988. From this point it was called the Team Trophy and sponsored by the German Cooperative Financial Group.

The race was promoted to Group 2 level in 1989. It was cut to 2,100 metres in 1990, and to 2,000 metres in 1991.

The event became known as the Made in Europe-Trophy in 1995, and the Flughafen Frankfurt-Trophy in 1997. It was renamed the Henninger-Trophy and increased to 2,050 metres in 1999. It was titled the Arthur Andersen Euro-Cup in 2000.

The race was run at Cologne over 1,850 metres in 2001. That year's edition was called the Preis des Bankhaus Sal. Oppenheim.

The Euro-Cup returned to Frankfurt with a distance of 2,000 metres in 2002. Subsequent sponsors included Ernst & Young and Merrill Lynch.

The race was downgraded to Group 3 level in 2007. It was last run in 2009.

Records
Most successful horse:
 no horse won this race more than once in the period shown

Leading jockey since 1986 (4 wins):
 Andrasch Starke – Bad Bertrich (1994), Oxalagu (1998), Elle Danzig (2000), Fight Club (2005)

Leading trainer since 1986 (4 wins):
 Peter Schiergen – Catella (1999), Walzerkoenigin (2002), Soldier Hollow (2004), Nordtänzerin (2006)

Winners since 1986

 The 2001 running took place at Cologne.

See also
 List of German flat horse races

References
 Racing Post:
 
 galopp-sieger.de – Euro-Cup.
 horseracingintfed.com – International Federation of Horseracing Authorities – Euro-Cup (2009).
 pedigreequery.com – Euro-Cup – Frankfurt.

Open middle distance horse races
Horse races in Germany
Discontinued horse races
Sports competitions in Frankfurt